Victoria is a municipality in the Cabañas department of El Salvador. Ciudad Victoria is home to a community-based radio station, Radio Victoria.

Municipalities of the Cabañas Department